FC Terton (also known as Terton FC) is a professional football club from Thimphu, Bhutan, currently competing in Bhutan Premier League Qualifiers.

History
Terton made their debut in the 2015 Thimphu League, which they won by three points from Thimphu, collecting the Nu 400,000 first prize and qualifying for the 2015 Bhutan National League. During their inaugural season in the Thimphu League, they lost only twice; a 5–3 defeat to Druk Star and a 3–1 loss to eventual runners-up Thimphu. They were equally successful in their debut season in the National League, beating Thimphu City 4–2 in the final game to confirm the championship, collecting the Nu 10 million first place prize and qualifying for the 2017 AFC Cup.

Performance in AFC competitions

AFC Cup: 1 Appearance
2017: Preliminary round

Achievements 

Thimphu League 
 Winners: 2015

Bhutan National, Premier League
 Winners: 2015

National Futsal - Minifootball League
Winners: 2013, 2014

References

Football clubs in Bhutan
Sport in Bhutan
Association football clubs established in 2014